The Commune of Santiago is the central commune of the Santiago Province, located at the center of the Santiago Metropolitan Region in Chile's Central Zone. Locally, Santiago is usually abbreviated Stgo. It is also called as "Santiago Centro" (Central Santiago) in order to differentiate it from Greater Santiago, a larger entity which includes Santiago Commune along with other 36 communes.

History
The city of Santiago was founded on February 12, 1541 as "Santiago de la Nueva Extremadura" by Pedro de Valdivia. It is officially the provincial, regional and national capital. It encompasses the oldest part of the city —that enclosed by old rail lines—, including downtown, and houses all major government infrastructure, including the government palace La Moneda.

Demographics
The population shrank by 13.1% (30,185 persons) in the ten years since the 1992 population of 230,977. In 2002, there were 17,514 households, each with an average income of $38,648 in PPP US dollars in 2006.

The commune is subdivided into 29 census districts.

Administration
As a commune, Santiago is a third-level administrative division of Chile administered by a municipal council, headed by a mayor who is directly elected every four years. Since 2021 the mayoress is Irací Hassler (PCCh). The communal council has the following members:
 Dafne Concha Ferrando (PCCh)
 Camila Davagnino Reyes (PCCh)
 Virginia Palma Erpel (PCCh)
 Rosario Carvajal Araya (Ind-PI)
 Yasna Tapia Cisternas (COM)
 Ana María Yáñez Varas (RD)
 Marcela Urquiza Díaz (Ind-PEV)
 Paola Melo Cea  (PS)
 Juan Mena Echeverría (RN)
 Santiago Mekis Arnolds (RN)

Within the electoral divisions of Chile, Santiago is represented in the Chamber of Deputies by Gonzalo Winter (CS), Lorena Fries (Unir), Emilia Schneider (COM), Alejandra Placencia (PCCh), Helia Molina (PPD), Jorge Alessandri Vergara (UDI), María Luisa Cordero (Ind-RN) and Johannes Kaiser (PLR) as part of the 10th electoral district. The commune is represented in the Senate by Fabiola Campillai Rojas (Ind), Claudia Pascual (PCCh), Luciano Cruz Coke (EVO), Manuel José Ossandon (RN) and Rojo Edwards (PLR) as part of the 7th senatorial constituency (Santiago Metropolitan Region).

References

External links
 
  Municipality of Santiago
  ZIP Code Santiago

Communes of Chile
Santiago, Chile
Populated places in Santiago Province, Chile
1541 establishments in the Spanish Empire